Nina Davis (born December 7, 1994) is an American basketball player. Davis represented the United States at the 2015 Summer Universiade. Davis was awarded the Big 12 Conference Women's Basketball Player of the Year as a sophomore at Baylor. Despite scoring over 2,000 points and grabbing over 1,000 rebounds during her career, Davis went undrafted in the 2017 WNBA Draft. In February 2019, Central High School retired her jersey number (13).

Baylor statistics

Source

References

1994 births
Living people
All-American college women's basketball players
American women's basketball players
Basketball players from Memphis, Tennessee
Baylor Bears women's basketball players
Medalists at the 2015 Summer Universiade
Universiade gold medalists for the United States
Universiade medalists in basketball
United States women's national basketball team players